Students Supporting Israel (also known as SSI) is a pro-Israel international student activist movement that supports Israel as a Jewish Democratic nation-state.  As of April 2015, SSI has more than 45 chapters across campuses in the United States, Canada and Austria. SSI was founded in 2012 in Minnesota and its national offices are in Minneapolis. The founders of the organizations are Ilan Sinelnikov, Valeria Chazin and Naor Bitton.

Campaigns

Lt. Col, Eyal Dror Reserves Tour: Chapters of Students Supporting Israel located on various California campuses hosted Lt. Col, Eyal Dror Reserves, the commanding officer of Israel's Operation Good Neighbor that treated thousands of Syrian civilians in hospitals along the border. He presented Israel’s humanitarian efforts, and the story of this important mission.
"Never Forget" 09.11.2001: This campaign was established to show solidarity with the families of the victims and remember the attacks on America, Israel's greatest ally, on September 11, 2001, while simultaneously drawing the parallels of America's alliance with Israel against terrorism.

Awards and achievements
In 2015, SSI won the Outstanding Outreach and Pro Israel Activism Award by Israel’s Consulate to the Midwest. In 2014 it won the CAMERA David Bar Illan award, as well as the Zionist Organization of America Annual Award. As a student group, it has demonstrated influence in student government bodies on several occasions including the Israeli Academic Cooperation position statement at the University of Minnesota, which paved the way for a similar Israeli Support Resolution at the University of Georgia followed shortly by Texas A&M University,

References

External links

2012 establishments in Minnesota
Jewish organizations based in the United States
Organizations established in 2012
Student political organizations
Zionist organizations